Ángel Roldán (18 January 1915 – 17 October 1977) was a Mexican fencer. He competed in the individual and team épée events at the 1960 Summer Olympics.

References

External links
 

1915 births
1977 deaths
Mexican male épée fencers
Olympic fencers of Mexico
Fencers at the 1960 Summer Olympics
Fencers from Mexico City
Mexican male tennis players
20th-century Mexican people